A general election was held in the U.S. state of Idaho on November 6, 2018. All of Idaho's executive officers were up for election as well as both of Idaho's two seats in the United States House of Representatives.

Governor

Republican Governor Butch Otter was succeeded by businessman Brad Little.

Lieutenant Governor

Incumbent Republican Lieutenant Governor Brad Little did not run for re-election to a third full term and instead ran for governor.

Democratic primary

Results

Republican primary
Declared
Marv Hagedorn, State Senator
Bob Nonini, State Senator
Kelley Packer, State representative
Janice McGeachin, former State Representative
Stephen J. Yates, former Deputy National Security Advisor to the Vice President and Idaho Republican Party Chair

Results

General election

Results

Attorney General 
Incumbent Republican Attorney General Lawrence Wasden ran for re-election to a fifth term.

Democratic primary

Results

Republican primary

Results

General election
Governing magazine projected the race as "safe Republican".

Results

Secretary of State
Incumbent Republican Secretary of State Lawerence Denney ran for re-election to a second term.

Democratic primary

Results

Republican primary

Results

General election

Predictions

Results

Treasurer
Incumbent Republican State Treasurer Ron Crane did not run for re-election to a sixth term. No Democrats filed to run for this race.

Republican primary
Declared
Vicky McIntyre, Ada County Treasurer
Tom Kealey, Chicago Connection Restaurant Group Owner and former Certified Public Accountant
Julie Ellsworth, former State representative

Results

General election

Results

Controller
Incumbent Republican Controller Brandon D. Woolf ran for re-election to a second full term. He was unopposed in the general election because no Democrats filed to challenge Woolf.

Republican primary

Results

General election

Results

Superintendent of Public Instruction

Incumbent Republican Superintendent of Public Instruction Sherri Ybarra ran for re-election to a second term.

Wilder School Superintendent Jeff Dillon filed to run in the Republican primary on April 29, 2017.

Democratic primary

Results

Republican primary

Results

General election

Results

United States House of Representatives

Both of Idaho's two seats in the United States House of Representatives were up for election in 2018.

Idaho's 1st Congressional District 
Raúl Labrador did not seek reelection for his congressional seat (CD1); he instead ran for Governor.

Candidates

Declared

Michael Snyder, Liberty Republican, Author and journalistic figure
David H. Leroy, Former Lt. Governor of Idaho, former Attorney General of Idaho, and current Abraham Lincoln activist and lawyer 
Russ Fulcher, Former Idaho State Senator for Idaho Legislative District 22 and Idaho Legislative District 21 
Luke Malek, Current Idaho House of Representative member for Idaho Legislative District 4 Seat A

Christy Perry, Idaho State Representative, District 11B

Idaho's 2nd Congressional District 
Mike Simpson ran for reelection in 2018.

References

External links
Candidates at Vote Smart 
Candidates at Ballotpedia
Campaign finance at OpenSecrets

Official Lieutenant Governor campaign websites
Kristin Collum (D) for Lt. Governor
Janice McGeachin (R) for Lt. Governor

Official Attorney General campaign websites
Lawrence Wasden (R) for Attorney General

Official Secretary of State campaign websites
Lawrence Denney (R) for Secretary of State
Jill Humble (D) for Secretary of State

Official Treasurer campaign websites
Julie Ellsworth (R) for State Treasurer

Official Controller campaign websites
Brandon Woolf (R) for State Controller

Official Superintendent of Public Instruction campaign websites
Sherri Ybarra (R) for Superintendent

 
Idaho